Arash Ferdowsi (born October 7, 1985) is an Iranian-American billionaire entrepreneur. He is the co-founder of Dropbox.

Early life and education
Ferdowsi was born in Overland Park, Kansas, United States on 7 October 1985. He attended Blue Valley Northwest High School, a public high school in Overland Park, graduating first in his class in 2004. Ferdowsi went on to study electrical engineering and computer science at the Massachusetts Institute of Technology (MIT), dropping out of his program in his last year to focus on his business.

Family
Ferdowsi is the son of Iranian immigrants Gholam Ferdowsi (b. 1950) and Tahmineh "Tammy" Faridazar (b. 1959). Ferdowsi's father, a mortgage broker, is a native of Tabriz in northwestern Iran. His parents settled in the United States following the 1979 Iranian Revolution, then met and married in 1984 while students at the University of Central Missouri and the University of Missouri–Kansas City, respectively.

Career
Ferdowsi launched Dropbox in June 2007 with his business partner, Drew Houston, at Massachusetts Institute of Technology. In September 2007, Ferdowsi moved his company to San Francisco and raised venture capital from Sequoia Capital, Accel, Y Combinator, and a handful of individual investors. In March 2018, Dropbox underwent an initial public offering, valuing the company at around US$9.2 billion.

From the company's establishment in June 2007 until October 2016, Ferdowsi served as the chief technology officer (CTO) of Dropbox. In 2020 he left the company.

Awards and highlights
Inc. Magazine named Ferdowsi to its 2011 "30 Under 30" top entrepreneurs list.
Fortune Magazine named Ferdowsi to its 2011 "40 Under 40" list.
TechCrunch awarded Ferdowsi a Crunchie for "Founder Of The Year".

References

MIT School of Engineering alumni
American people of Iranian descent
American billionaires
People from Overland Park, Kansas
Living people
1985 births
American technology company founders
American chief technology officers
American technology executives
Businesspeople of Iranian descent